Chehra is an Indian television suspense drama series which aired on STAR Plus in 2009. The series was produced by Yash Patnaik of Beyond Dreams Productions. The series premiered on 16 March 2009 and ended on 2 July 2009.

Plot 
The story revolves around a young girl who is full of life and explores the world in her wheel chair. Chehra traverses through Bandini's life, her undying spirit and her life after marriage. 24-year- old Bandini is witty, full of life  and a nature lover. Disabled in an accident, she has taken her disadvantage in her stride and doesn't let pity and sympathy bring her down. Her life takes a ‘U’ turn when she meets a young, dashing, wealthy business tycoon, Garv. Bandini is stunned when this most sought-after bachelor proposes marriage to her. Friends, neighbors and relatives, all are stunned by such a good proposal for Bandini. Some think it's pure luck while others think it's her good karma. But there is more to it than meets the eye.

Cast 
Hritu Dudani ... Bandini 
Mohit Raina ... Garv, a young, handsome business tycoon, Bandini's husband.
Geetu Bawa ... Sujata, Bandini's younger sister.
Rajan Bhise ... Shashikant, Bandini's father.
Narendra Jha ... Karan, Garv's elder brother and India's best plastic surgeon
Nishigandha Wad ... Nirmala, Garv's mother
Sunil Shinde ... Kishan, Garv's father, mentally deranged
Renu Chahal ... Sitara, a Servant 
Vaishali Nazareth ... Karan's wife

Production
While shooting for the sequence of character Bandini drowning in a lake, Hritu Dudani lost her control and fell into the lake and started drowning while Mohit Raina saved her. Because of this, the shoot halted for a while until Dudani revived from the shock.

References

External links
Chehra Official Website

StarPlus original programming
Indian drama television series
2009 Indian television series debuts
2009 Indian television series endings